Dr. Ishari K Ganesh (pronounced as Ai-sari) is the founder, chairman and Chancellor of Vels University in Chennai, India.
He founded the Vael's Educational Trust in 1992 in the memory of his late father Isari Velan, a former Member of Legislative Assembly in the state government of M. G. Ramachandran.

He was the president of the Pachaiyappa's Trust board (2011-2014).

He was the secretary of the consortium of colleges affiliated to The Tamil Nadu Dr. M.G.R. Medical University(2007-2009).

Ganesh is also the founder and chairman of Vels Film International, which produces films in Tamil cinema. Ganesh has acted in 5 movies from (1992-2018) in supporting role and did a role  in S. Shankar’s 2.0 (2018).

Filmography
Actor
Uthama Purushan (1989)
Vaaku Moolam (1991)
Dharma Seelan (1993)
Doubles (2000)
Aval Paavam (2000)
Ninaikkaadha Naalillai (2001)
Thulluvadho Ilamai (2002)
One Two Three (2002) 
Engeyum Kadhal (2011)
Lakshmi (2018)
2.0 (2018)

Producer

References

External links
 Rs.686 crore for conservation, protection of natural resources
 CII, Vels University sign pact
 Skill development programme for MBA students
 Vael's signs MoU with TAFE, Australia
 "Report of general body meeting soon"

Scholars from Chennai
Living people
Indian film producers
Tamil film producers
Male actors in Tamil cinema
1966 births